On 26 November 1944, four C-47 transport aircraft of the 442nd Operations Group departed from Advanced Landing Ground "A-4 in Pays de la Loire, northern France, en route to Chalgrove Airfield, Oxfordshire, England. The C-47s were flying in a Diamond formation. After crossing the English Channel low cloud forced the aircraft to descend from 1,500 feet to 1,200 feet. Three of the four C-47 descended another 200 feet, and shortly thereafter, the three C-47s crashed into the side of Leith Hill, the highest summit of the Greensand Ridge. The crash killed all thirteen crewmen on the three C-47, five on 43–47975, five on 42-93754 & three on 42–92837. The fourth C-47 landed safely at Chalgrove Airfield.

References

Aviation accidents and incidents in England
1944 disasters in the United Kingdom
Disasters in Surrey